Rachel Joyce (born 1962) is a British writer. She has written plays for BBC Radio 4, and jointly won the 2007 Tinniswood Award for her radio play To Be a Pilgrim. Her debut novel, The Unlikely Pilgrimage of Harold Fry, was on the longlist for the 2012 Man Booker Prize, and in December 2012 she was awarded the "New Writer of the Year" award by the National Book Awards for this book.

She had an earlier career as an actress,<ref name="RSC1996"> Includes two photographs of Joyce, playing Celia in As You Like It</ref> and has said that between her first writing ambitions aged 14 and the writing of her first novel she was "a young woman, a mother, an actress, a writer of radio drama - not to mention a terrible waitress in a wine bar, a door-to-door sales girl for one morning, and an assistant in a souvenir shop".

She is married to actor Paul Venables, and lives in Gloucestershire with her husband and four children.

She is the sister of actress Emily Joyce.

BooksThe Unlikely Pilgrimage of Harold Fry (2012,)Perfect (2013,)The Love Song of Miss Queenie Hennessy (2014,)A Snow Garden and Other Stories (2015,)The Music Shop (2017,)Miss Benson's Beetle (11 June 2020,)Maureen Fry and the Angel of the North(20 October 2022,  Doubleday: ISBN 978-0857529008)

 Awards 
Tinniswood Award, 2007 (joint award), for To Be A Pilgrim French Literary Award ("Prix Littéraire des Jeunes Européens, 2014 France) for The Unlikely Pilgrimage of Harold FryWilbur Smith Adventure Writing Prize, 2021, for Miss Benson's Beetle''

Reference List

External links
 Official Website

Video interview published by Random House publishers
 

Living people
1962 births
British women novelists
21st-century British novelists
21st-century British women writers
British women dramatists and playwrights
21st-century British dramatists and playwrights
Writers from London